Vitisin A may refer to:
 Vitisin A (pyranoanthocyanin)
 Vitisin A (stilbenoid)

See also
 Vitisin